Night of Fire is the 5th single by Japanese band Dream. The song itself is a cover of the Eurobeat classic, previously recorded in English by the Italian artist Niko in 1999 and composed by Bratt Sinclaire, which also appeared in the popular anime and manga series, Initial D. The single reached #20 on the weekly Oricon charts in 2000. A promotional video for the single was released on the DAYDREAM DVD and VHS. Dream's version features Japanese lyrics by group member Mai Matsumuro. The single was simultaneously released on the same day as the Super Eurobeat Presents Euro Dream Land album.

Credits
 Lyrics: Mai Matsumuro
 Music: Andrea Leonardi

References

External links
 http://www.oricon.co.jp/music/release/d/45207/1/

2000 singles
Dream (Japanese group) songs
Songs written by Mai Matsumuro
2000 songs
Avex Trax singles